Dirinon is a commune in the Finistère department of Brittany in northwestern France.

Population
Inhabitants of Dirinon are called in French Dirinonais.

See also
Communes of the Finistère department
Dirinon Parish close
List of the works of the Maître de Guimiliau

References

External links

Official website 

Mayors of Finistère Association 

Communes of Finistère